The 1983 North Dakota State football team represented North Dakota State University during the 1983 NCAA Division II football season, and completed the 87th season of Bison football. The Bison played their home games at Dacotah Field in Fargo, North Dakota. The 1983 team came off a 12–1 record from the previous season. The 1983 team was led by coach Don Morton. The team finished the regular season with a 9–1 record and made the NCAA Division II playoffs.

Schedule

References

North Dakota State
North Dakota State Bison football seasons
NCAA Division II Football Champions
North Central Conference football champion seasons
North Dakota State Bison football